Callahan County is a county located in the U.S. state of Texas. As of the 2020 census, the population was 13,708. Its county seat is Baird. The county was founded in 1858 and later organized in 1877. It is named for James Hughes Callahan, an American soldier in the Texas Revolution. Callahan County is included in the Abilene, Texas metropolitan statistical area.

Geography

Callahan Divide is range of hills that extends  from west to southeast through Taylor and Callahan Counties, with highest elevation , which together with other elevated areas in the two counties provide advantages in wind energy.

Major highways
  Interstate 20
  U.S. Highway 283
  State Highway 36
  State Highway 206
  State Highway 351

Adjacent counties
 Shackelford County (north)
 Eastland County (east)
 Brown County (southeast)
 Coleman County (south)
 Taylor County (west)
 Jones County (northwest)

Demographics

Note: the US Census treats Hispanic/Latino as an ethnic category. This table excludes Latinos from the racial categories and assigns them to a separate category. Hispanics/Latinos can be of any race.

Per the 2010 United States census, Callahan County had 13,544 people.  Among non-Hispanics, this includes 12,065 White (89.1%), 135 Black (1.0%), 56 Asian (0.4%), 61 Native American, 7 Pacific Islander, 10 from some other race, and 185 from two or more races. The Hispanic or Latino population included 1,025 people (7.6%).

Of the 5,447 households, 27.1% had children under the age of 18 living with them, 57.0% were married couples living together, 5.2% had a female householder with children and no husband present, and 28.5% were not families. About 24.7% of households were one person and 32.3% had someone who was 65 or older.

The age distribution was 76.2% over 18 and 18.2% 65 or older. The median age was 43.0 years. The gender ratio was 48.8% male and 51.2% female.  Among 5,447 occupied households, 78.7% were owner-occupied and 21.3% were renter-occupied.

At the 2000 census, 12,905 people, 5,061 households, and 3,750 families were in the county.  The population density was 14 people per square mile (6/km2).  The 5,925 housing units averaged 7 /sq mi (3/km2).  The racial makeup of the county was 94.78% White, 0.22% Black or African American, 0.63% Native American, 0.26% Asian, 0.05% Pacific Islander, 2.70% from other races, and 1.35% from two or more races.  6.29% of the population were Hispanic or Latino of any race.
Of the 5,061 households, 31.90% had children under the age of 18 living with them, 61.60% were married couples living together, 9.30% had a female householder with no husband present, and 25.90% were not families. About 23.30% of households were one person, and 12.20% were one person aged 65 or older.  The average household size was 2.53, and the average family size was 2.97.

The age distribution was 26.20% under 18, 6.60% from 18 to 24, 24.90% from 25 to 44, 25.30% from 45 to 64, and 17.00% 65 or older.  The median age was 40 years. For every 100 females, there were 94.40 males.  For every 100 females age 18 and over, there were 90.90 males.

The median household income was $32,463 and the median family income  was $37,165. Males had a median income of $27,086 versus $19,720 for females. The per capita income for the county was $15,204.  About 9.00% of families and 12.20% of the population were below the poverty line, including 14.80% of those under age 18 and 9.80% of those age 65 or over.

Politics

Communities

Cities
 Baird (county seat)
 Clyde

Towns
 Cross Plains
 Putnam

Unincorporated communities
 Cottonwood
 Eula
 Oplin

Ghost towns
 Belle Plain
 Callahan City
 Dudley
 Pueblo

See also

 Robert E. Howard Museum
 List of museums in West Texas
 National Register of Historic Places listings in Callahan County, Texas
 Recorded Texas Historic Landmarks in Callahan County

References

External links

 Callahan County in Handbook of Texas Online at the University of Texas
 Callahan County Website
 Callahan County Profile from the Texas Association of Counties

 
1877 establishments in Texas
Abilene metropolitan area